Siccia bicolorata is a moth in the  family Erebidae. It was described by Romieux in 1937. It is found in the Democratic Republic of Congo.

References

Natural History Museum Lepidoptera generic names catalog

Moths described in 1937
Nudariina
Endemic fauna of the Democratic Republic of the Congo